The  is a compact car derived from the Corolla, manufactured and sold by Toyota. Introduced in 2006, the first generation three/five-door hatchback shared the platform with the E150 series Corolla, while the second generation five-door hatchback and station wagon called "Touring Sports" uses the E180 platform. The "Auris" name is based on the Latin word for "gold", "aurum".

In Europe, Toyota positioned the Auris as the replacement for the Corolla hatchback, while the saloon version continued with the Corolla nameplate. Starting with the E210 model, the Auris nameplate was discontinued and used the Corolla nameplate instead, except for Taiwan, retained the Auris nameplate for the hatchback version until July 2020.

For the first generation only, the more luxurious Auris was named  in Japan. The Auris succeeded the Allex in Japan and the Corolla RunX. Toyota Australia and Toyota New Zealand resisted suggestions from Toyota Japan to adopt the new European Auris name for the Corolla.

The Japanese model went on sale at Netz dealerships on 23 October 2006, while European models went on sale in early 2007. The second generation was later available at Toyopet Store dealerships from 18 April 2016.



First generation (E150; 2006) 

The Auris space concept is a concept using Vibrant Clarity design philosophy. It included panoramic glass roof, flat rear passenger floor, high window surfaces, 19-inch alloy wheels, free form geometric lamps, prominent brake callipers, deep rear bumper with integrated chrome exhausts, gold coloured body.

The vehicle was unveiled at the October 2006 Paris Motor Show. Exterior styling was done by ED², Toyota's European design base located in southern France.

The former Kanto Auto Works produced the Auris and Blade from October 2006 to November 2011.

The Auris received a five star cabin protection rating from Euro NCAP for adults, but four stars for children.

Markets

Japan 
Introduced as a new model in 2006, the Auris replaced the Corolla Runx and Allex. Trim levels were 150X,180G and RS. For model year 2007 on Japanese models only, G-BOOK, a subscription telematics service, was offered as an option. Japanese models were built by Iwate Plant, Kanto Auto Works, Ltd.

S package TUMI version (2007)
Designed by TUMI, this was a Japanese market limited edition (1000 units) version. It included model specific seat cloth, floor mats, a luggage mat, illuminated scuff plates, shift knob, instrument panel ornament and badging.

The vehicles were sold through Toyota's Netz dealers.

Grayge selection (2008)
This version came with a grey interior, dual zone climate control, passenger side under seat tray. The 150X M package version added rear privacy glass, smart entry and start system and anti theft system. The models went on sale on 29 January 2008, through Toyota's Netz dealers.

With the update of 2008, keyless entry, under seat tray became standard on all models.

Auris GT Concept
In January 2011, Toyota revealed the Toyota Auris GT at the Tokyo Auto Salon. Based on a 1.8L Auris. All equipment is available for purchase individually except for the supercharger. The concept was shown in Gold metallic paint with a black TRD graphic along the lower side of the car.

Australia 
In Australia, the Auris is sold as "Corolla" hatchback with "Seca" emblem on the hatch door above the licence plate. Grades are: base-model "Ascent", mid-spec "Conquest", sports "Levin SX" and sports luxury "Levin ZR".
All models are powered by the 1.8-litre 2ZR-FE engine, with either a six-speed manual or four-speed automatic. All, but the Ascent come with standard alloy wheels and fog lights.

The Levin models have sports style body kits. Electric moonroof is only available as an option on Levin ZR. As of January 2009, ESC has been made available as standard on Conquest and Levin ZR – Ascent and Levin SX have ESC as an option.

The Australian Corolla Hatchback received a facelift during the fourth quarter of 2009. The entire body design has been given a sporty makeover. Major changes were made to the front and rear fascia, wheel designs and interior trims. The "Seca" branding has been removed from the hatch door, tail lights design has been changed.

A newer bumper design has also been adapted with a special "diffuser" fitted at the bottom to give the rear a sportier look and on either side of the diffuser are reflectors which were lacking in any other previous Corolla Hatchback models. The front receives new grille and revised headlamps.

Fog lights have been removed from the Conquest model. Ascent continues to receive 15-inch steel wheels while the rest receive 16-inch alloys with Conquest and Levin SX sharing the same alloys. Side mirrors now feature indicators. The trim materials have also been changed along with a new D-shaped sports steering wheel available on Conquest and Levin models. Other changes have also been made to equipment and technology. Moonroof is still only available as an option on Levin ZR alone.

New Zealand 

In New Zealand, the Auris was sold as "Corolla" hatchback. Grades are: base-model "GX", sports luxury "GLX". All models are powered by the 1.8-litre Petrol 2ZR-FE engine, with either a six speed manual or four speed automatic. GX models come with steel wheels and hubcaps, whilst GLX models come with alloys, front fog lights, leather bound steering wheel & shifter knob and cruise control. Diesel models were also available in a 1.4L and 2.0L D-4D both being a 6-speed manual only.

The New Zealand Corolla Hatchback, like Australia, received a facelift during the fourth quarter of 2009. The entire body design has been given a sporty makeover. Major changes were made to the front and rear fascia, wheel designs and interior trims. Tail lights design has been changed.

A newer bumper design has also been adapted with a special "diffuser" fitted at the bottom to give the rear a sportier look and on either side of the diffuser are reflectors which were lacking in any other previous Corolla Hatchback models. The front receives new grille and revised headlamps.

Trim lines and options remained the same with both the GX and GLX models pre-facelifted versions.

Europe 

The Auris was released on 1 February 2007 in the United Kingdom, replacing the E120 series Corolla hatchback. Toyota positioned the Auris at the lower medium segment to compete with cars such as Volkswagen Golf, Vauxhall/Opel Astra, Hyundai i30 and the Ford Focus.

Trim levels were T2, T3 and T Spirit – followed by the T180 model in April 2007. European trim levels were Terra, Strata, Luna, Sol, Premium and Prestige. In February 2007, Toyota announced an investment of £100 million in its Deeside engine factory to build a petrol engine for the Auris.

The Deeside plant would start building 1.33-litre Dual VVT-i engine beginning in 2009–10, and would also produce Auris engines previously built in Japan.

Engines for the European Auris are:

TOD engines were introduced in 2008. The 1NR-FE 1.33 Dual VVT-i engine featured Toyota's first Stop & Start system sold in Europe, and replaced the 1.4 VVT-i engine. The 2.0 D-4D engine added a diesel particulate filter. A 1.6 Valvematic replaced the 1.6 Dual VVT-i engine.

Auris Hybrid 

The Auris HSD Full Hybrid Concept was unveiled at the September 2009 Frankfurt Motor Show. The concept version included Hybrid Synergy Drive technology, 18-inch alloy wheels with low rolling resistance tyres, a larger, more efficient rear spoiler, 20 mm lower ride height, seats and upper dashboard with blue Gaucholino leather upholstery, instrument cluster with hybrid blue illumination, solar panel roof with ventilation.

On 17 July 2009, Toyota announced the production of hybrid Auris by Toyota Motor Manufacturing (UK) Ltd (TMUK) beginning in 2010. It is equipped with engines produced at TMUK's Deeside Plant and produced at TMUK's Burnaston Plant.

The production version of the Auris Hybrid was presented at the March 2010 Geneva Motor Show. Mass production began in May 2010 at Toyota Manufacturing UK (TMUK) Burnaston plant and became the first mass-produced hybrid vehicle to be built in Europe.

The Auris Hybrid shares the same powertrain and batteries as the Prius. Carbon dioxide emissions (CO2) are 89 g/km on the standard test cycle which allows the model to be exempted from paying Vehicle Excise Duty (for cars registered prior to 1 April 2017) and the London congestion charge. In July 2010, the Auris Hybrid was selected as "WhatGreenCar Car of the Year 2010" by magazine What Car?.

In 2010, Toyota sold 15,237 Auris Hybrids in Europe, and 32,725 in 2011.

Toyota Blade 
The upscale sibling of the Auris is called the Blade. It replaced the Toyota Allex, which, in turn, was the replacement for the Toyota Sprinter. The Blade was sold at Japanese Toyota dealerships Toyota Store and Toyopet Store locations, while the Auris was exclusive to Toyota Corolla Store and Toyota NETZ Store locations. It has different front and rear sheetmetal, and is powered by Toyota's 2.4-litre 2AZ-FE engine. All 2.4-litre models have CVT automatic gearboxes.

In August 2007, Toyota released the Blade Master, an upgraded trim of the Blade which features Toyota's , 3.5-litre 2GR-FE V6 engine, larger brakes, and an upgraded suspension. Toyota discontinued the Blade in April 2012, ahead of the replacement of the Auris, without a direct successor.

Second generation (E180; 2012) 

The second generation Auris was revealed on 20 August 2012. It features a wider, lower stance with a more luxurious interior. Its dashboard was later used on the E170 series Corolla saloon that was released later in 2013.

It was first shown at the 2012 Paris Motor Show, with European sales starting in early 2013. It went on sale in Japan in September 2012, and in Australia and New Zealand in October 2012, as the Corolla Hatchback. In some parts of Asia, the sales of the new Auris was sold from the second quarter of 2013.

Markets

Japan 
For the Japanese market, the Auris is available with either 1.2-litre turbocharged 8NR-FTS, 1.5-litre 1NZ-FE or 1.8-litre 2ZR-FAE engine. The smaller motor is installed in the base model 150X. Front-wheel drive and full-time 4WD are offered. The more powerful engine is reserved for the more luxurious 180S and sporty RS models. The 180S comes only with CVT, while the sole transmission for the RS is six-speed manual. All cars with 1.8-litre engine are front-wheel-drive.

In August 2013, Toyota in Japan launched an advertising campaign for the Auris, featuring Char Aznable from the Mobile Suit Gundam series. As part of the collaboration, Toyota unveiled a one off "MS-186H-CA" Auris that takes styling cues from the anime.

The facelift model went on sale in Japan on 6 April 2015, while the Hybrid model went on sale on 18 April 2016. When the sales of the Hybrid model began, the Netz logo emblem on the front grille was replaced by the Toyota logo emblem, and it began to be sold at Toyopet Store dealerships. The Auris was discontinued there on 20 March 2018.

Australia and New Zealand 
In Australia, the Auris continued to be called the Corolla Hatchback. Model grades are Ascent, Ascent Sport, Levin SX and Levin ZR. All models are motored by 1.8-litre engine matched to six-speed manual or CVT gearbox. The Levin sport models have front sports seats, carbon fiber-like interior trim and 17-inch alloys. Panoramic roof is available for the top-of-the-line Levin ZR.

Meanwhile, for the New Zealand market the GX and GLX are the equivalent of Ascent and Ascent Sport. Manual transmission is only for the base GX. The GLX, as well as the sporty Levin SX and ZR come with CVT only.

Based on the Ascent hatchback, the limited edition Corolla RZ was released in 2014. It has black alloys, special decals, and upgraded interior.

The facelift model Corolla hatchback is introduced in mid-2015 with new front fascia and restyled tail lights. The Levin moniker was dropped from the sporty models, which are now simply called Corolla SX and ZR. The SX and ZR have sporty front bumper and lower body kits which distinguish them from the Ascent and Ascent Sport. The ZR is only offered with CVT.

The Hybrid model based on the Ascent Sport was released on 14 June 2016.

Ireland 
In Ireland, the Auris is available in a 5-door van form. This model is closely related to the 5-door hatchback. The main changes are a flat floor pan instead of the rear seat, black glass on the rear doors and a divider between the front seats and the load area. As of June 2019, this model is still in production.

North America 

Toyota introduced the Scion iM concept car at the November 2014 Los Angeles Auto Show. It was based on the Auris five-door hatchback with aggressive body kits, lowered suspension, high performance brakes and 19-inch alloy wheels. The production version for the North American market debuted at the New York International Auto Show in April 2015.

While the 2016 iM partially filled the void left by the discontinued Scion xB, Toyota stated that it was not a direct replacement. The engine is mated to a six-speed manual transmission or a continuously variable transmission (CVTi-S).

In the United States, the Scion iM sold 5,097 units in 2015. Due to the discontinuation of the Scion marque in 2016, the vehicle was re-branded as the Toyota Corolla iM for the 2017 model year. The Toyota Corolla iM therefore has the Toyota and iM emblem, but the Corolla emblem was never applied to the cars. Changes with the Corolla iM included a smaller under carriage shield that does not require removal for easier oil changes. The replaceable oil element filter was changed to the spin on cartridge type. The Corolla iM continued until it was replaced by the E210 series Corolla hatchback in March 2018, for the 2019 model year. All iM cars were manufactured in Japan.

Touring Sports (station wagon) 

Toyota unveiled a world premiere at the 2012 Paris Motor Show of the Auris in a new estate or station wagon variant, which is 285 mm longer than the five-door hatchback. It also represents the first model in its segment to be offered with a full hybrid powertrain.

The wheelbase is kept to 2600 mm just like its five-door twin however its profile of the estate version is different, with the steeply raked windscreen flowing into the extended roofline. The estate is 285 mm longer, providing more loadspace.

The rear bumper and the tailgate has a different styling, while the sill is set to be 80 mm lower than it is on its hatchback twin. The engine lineup is carried over from the hatchback, including 1.33-litre Dual VVT-i and 1.6-litre Valvematic petrol units, plus a 1.4-litre D-4D diesel.

Third generation (E210; 2018) 

The third generation Auris is based on the Toyota New Global Architecture (TNGA) platform. It was unveiled as a pre-production model in March 2018 at the Geneva Motor Show. The Auris nameplate was discontinued across Europe with the production version of the E210 series Corolla in January 2019, but it had been used in Taiwan from September 2018 to July 2020. The Taiwanese Auris is powered by a 2.0-litre M20A-FKS petrol engine mated to a simulated 10-speed Direct Shift K120 continuously variable transmission. It is equipped with TSS, VSC, TRC, HAC, Head-Up-Display, Push Start and Smart Entry.

On 15 July 2020, the Taiwanese Auris was renamed to Corolla Sport.

Sales

Motorsports 

The Auris-based Corolla hatchback was the winner of 2008 and 2009 Australian Rally Championship. This so-called Corolla S2000 has a modified 2.0-litre naturally aspirated 3S-GE engine as used by the Celica SS-III, all-wheel-drive system from the Celica GT-Four, and six-speed sequential gearbox. Neal Bates and co-driver Coral Taylor won the series of 2008, while Simon and Sue Evans were the winner in 2009.

References

External links 

 

Auris
Cars introduced in 2006
Cars of Turkey
2010s cars
2020s cars
Compact cars
Hatchbacks
Station wagons
Front-wheel-drive vehicles
All-wheel-drive vehicles
Hybrid electric cars
Partial zero-emissions vehicles
Vehicles with CVT transmission
Euro NCAP small family cars